Gerad Adams (born May 3, 1978) is a Canadian professional ice hockey defenceman who was previously the coach of the Sheffield Steelers of the Elite Ice Hockey League.

Career statistics

External links

1978 births
Living people
Canadian expatriate ice hockey players in England
Canadian expatriate ice hockey players in Scotland
Canadian expatriate ice hockey players in the United States
Canadian expatriate ice hockey players in Wales
Canadian ice hockey defencemen
Cardiff Devils players
Edinburgh Capitals players
Hampton Roads Admirals players
Ice hockey people from Saskatchewan
Ice hockey player-coaches
Kelowna Rockets players
London Knights (UK) players
Portland Pirates players
Regina Pats players
Richmond Renegades players
Sheffield Steelers players
Sportspeople from Regina, Saskatchewan